All to Myself may refer to:

 "All to Myself" (Marianas Trench song)
 "All to Myself" (Guy Sebastian song)
 "All to Myself" (Dan + Shay song)